Pathman s/o Matialakan (born 1 June 1980) is a Singaporean basketball player who last played for the Singapore Slingers in the Asean Basketball League (ABL). He goes by the nicknames "Pride of the Lion City" as the only Asian to ever played in the Australian National Basketball League and "17-foot assassin" as he models his mid-range jumpshots after NBA player David West.

Club career

Pathman is the first Singaporean to play and score points in a professional league, the Australian National Basketball League, and the longest serving local player in the team’s four-year history. On August 2009, Pathman signed a one-year contract to play for the Singapore Slingers along with Hong Wei Jian.

International career

Pathman is also a member of the Singapore national basketball team for men. He is also the most veteran player in the national team.

Personal life 
On 19 Dec 2009, Pathman proposed on court, after an ABL game against the Thailand Tigers, in front of the home crowd, to his long-time girlfriend Li Ling.

In 2011, Pathman married Singapore national netball player Li Ling.

ABL Statistics

|-
| align="left" | 2009-10
| align="left" | Slingers
| 18|| 1|| 12:29 || .475 || .000|| .889 || 1.4 || .4 || .17|| .06|| 3.7
|-
| align="left" | Career
| align="left" |
| 18|| 1 || 12:29 || .475|| .000|| .889 || 1.4  || .4 || .17|| .06 || 3.7

Playoffs

|-
| align="left" | 2009-10
| align="left" | Slingers
| 3 || 0 || 8:50 || .375 || .000 || 1.000 || 2.3 || .3 || 1.67 || .00 || 3.3
|-
| align="left" | Career
| align="left" |
| 3 || 0 || 8.50 || .375 || .000 || 1.000 || 2.3 || .3 || 1.67 || .00 || 3.3

References

External links
 Singapore Slingers Profiles

1980 births
Living people
Singaporean men's basketball players
Singapore Slingers players
Power forwards (basketball)
Centers (basketball)
Singaporean people of Tamil descent
Singaporean sportspeople of Indian descent
21st-century Singaporean people